The Gay Vagabond is a 1941 American comedy film directed by William Morgan and written by Ewart Adamson and Taylor Caven. The film stars Roscoe Karns, Ruth Donnelly, Ernest Truex, Margaret Hamilton, Abner Biberman and Bernadene Hayes. The film was released on May 12, 1941, by Republic Pictures.

Plot
Arthur and Jerry Dixon are twin brothers, but they are very different: one is introverted and weak, the other is a womanizer and an adventurer who just arrived from China. The two switch roles.

Cast 
Roscoe Karns as Arthur Dixon, Jerry Dixon
Ruth Donnelly as Kate Dixon
Ernest Truex as A.J. Wilber
Margaret Hamilton as Agatha Badger
Abner Biberman as Ratmar
Bernadene Hayes as Spring Rutherford
Lynn Merrick as Betty Dixon
Rod Bacon as Franklin Atwater
Gloria Franklin as Sonya
Carol Adams as Lucille
Byron Foulger as Vogel
Paul Newlan as Lobang

References

External links
 

1941 films
American comedy films
1941 comedy films
Republic Pictures films
Films directed by William Morgan (director)
American black-and-white films
1940s English-language films
1940s American films